Yelverton Peyton King (1794 - July 5, 1868) was an American lawyer, legislator, and diplomat from Georgia.

King was born in Greene County, Georgia about twelve miles outside Greensboro.  He graduated from the University of Georgia and was admitted to the country bar at age 22.  He was soon elected solicitor of the Ocmulgee circuit.  He also served in the Georgia General Assembly.   In 1851, he was appointed Chargé d'Affaires to New Granada by President Millard Fillmore, and resigned in April 1853 due to poor health.

King married Eliza F. Strain and had five children.  He died on July 5, 1868.

References

1794 births
1868 deaths
University of South Carolina alumni
19th-century American diplomats